A twincharger refers to a compound forced induction system used on some internal combustion engines. It is a combination of an exhaust-driven turbocharger and a mechanically driven supercharger, each mitigating the weaknesses of the other.

Twincharging does not refer to a twin-turbo arrangement, but to a setup where two different types of compressors are used (instead of only turbochargers).

Overview and advantages 
A mechanically driven supercharger offers exceptional response and low-rpm performance, as it does not rely on pressurization of the exhaust manifold (assuming that it is a positive-displacement design, such as a Roots-type or twin-screw, as opposed to a centrifugal supercharger, which does not provide substantial boost in the lower rpm range), but is less efficient than a turbocharger due to increased parasitic load. A turbocharger sized to move a large volume of air tends to respond slowly to throttle input, while a smaller, more responsive turbocharger may fail to deliver sufficient boost pressure through an engine's upper rpm range.

The unacceptable lag time endemic to a large turbocharger is effectively neutralized when combined with a supercharger, which tends to generate substantial boost pressure much faster in response to throttle input, the end result being a lag-free power band with high torque at lower engine speeds and increased power at the upper end. Twincharging is therefore desirable for small-displacement motors (such as VW's 1.4TSI), especially those with a large operating rpm range, since they can take advantage of an artificially broad torque band over a large speed range.

Types
A twincharging system combines a supercharger and turbocharger in a complementary arrangement, with the intent of one compressor's advantage compensating for the other's disadvantage. There are two common types of twincharger systems: series and parallel.

Series

The series arrangement, the more common arrangement of twinchargers, is set up such that one compressor's output feeds the inlet of another. A supercharger is connected to a medium- to large-sized turbocharger. The supercharger provides near-instant manifold pressure (eliminating turbo lag, which would otherwise result when the turbocharger is not up to its operating speed). Once the turbocharger has reached operating speed, the supercharger can either continue compounding the pressurized air to the turbocharger inlet (yielding elevated intake pressures), or it can be bypassed and/or mechanically decoupled from the drivetrain via an electromagnetic clutch and bypass valve, increasing induction efficiency.

Other series configurations exist where no bypass system is employed and both compressors are in continuous use. As a result, compounded boost is always produced as the pressure ratios of the two compressors are multiplied, not added. This form of series twincharging allows for the production of boost pressures that would otherwise be inefficient or unachievable with other compressor arrangements.

However, turbo and supercharger efficiencies do not multiply. For example, if a turbocharger with an efficiency of 70% feeds into a Roots supercharger with an efficiency of 60%, the total compression efficiency would be somewhere in between. To calculate this efficiency, it is necessary to calculate the efficiencies of the 2 stages, first calculating the conditions of pressure and temperature at the exit of the first stage and starting from these to calculate for the second stage. A large turbocharger that produces  by itself, with a thermal efficiency of around 70%, would produce air only  in temperature. In addition, the cost of energy to compress air with a supercharger is higher than that of a turbocharger; if the supercharger is not compressing air, there remains only a small parasitic loss of rotating the working parts of the supercharger. This remaining loss can be eliminated by disconnecting the supercharger further using an electromagnetic clutch (such as those used in the VW 1.4TSI or Toyota 4A-GZE to bypass the supercharger in low-load conditions).

With series twincharging, the turbocharger can be of a less expensive and more durable journal bearing variety, and the sacrifice in boost response is more than made up for by the instant-on nature of positive-displacement superchargers. While the weight and cost of the supercharger assembly are always a factor, the inefficiency of the supercharger is minimized once the turbocharger reaches operating speed and the supercharger is effectively disconnected by the bypass valve.

Parallel

Parallel arrangements typically require the use of a bypass or diverter valve to allow one or both compressors to feed the engine optimally. If no valve was used and both compressors were merely routed directly to the intake manifold, the supercharger would blow backwards through the turbocharger compressor rather than pressurize the intake manifold, as that would be the path of least resistance. Thus, a diverter valve must be employed to vent turbocharger air until the appropriate intake manifold pressure has been reached.

Disadvantages
The main disadvantage of twincharging is the complexity and expense of components. Usually, to provide acceptable response, smoothness of power delivery, and adequate power gain over a single-compressor system, expensive electronic and/or mechanical controls must be used. In a spark-ignition engine, a low compression ratio must also be used if the supercharger produces high boost levels, negating some of the efficiency benefits of a lower-displacement engine.

Applications
The concept of twincharging was first used by Lancia in 1985 in its Lancia Delta S4 Group B rally car and its street-legal counterpart, the Delta S4 Stradale. The idea was also successfully adapted to production road cars by Nissan with their March Super Turbo. Additionally, multiple companies have produced aftermarket twincharger kits for cars like the Subaru Impreza WRX, Mini Cooper S, Ford Mustang, and Toyota MR2.

The Volkswagen 1.4 TSI is a 1400 cc engine – utilised by numerous automobiles of the VW Group – that sees use of both a turbocharger and a supercharger, and is available with eight power ratings:

Volvo produces a twincharged 1969 cc inline-four engine that is utilised in their T6, T8, and Polestar models. The T8 adds onto the T6 with a rear electric motor.

Jaguar Land Rover produces a twincharged 3.0L inline-six engine. 

The Danish Zenvo ST1 supercar makes use of both turbocharging and supercharging in its 7.0-litre V8 engine.

Alternative systems

Anti-lag system

Anti-lag systems work in one of two ways: by running a very rich air–fuel ratio and pumping air into the exhaust to ignite unburnt fuel in the exhaust manifold, or by severely retarding ignition timing to cause combustion to continue well after the exhaust valve has opened. Both methods involve combustion in the exhaust manifold to keep the turbocharger spinning, and the heat from this will shorten the life of the turbine greatly. Therefore, in spite of twincharging's complexity, its largest benefit over anti-lag systems in race cars is reliability.

Variable geometry turbocharger

A variable-geometry turbocharger provides an improved response at varying engine speeds. With an electronically controlled variable angle of incidence, it is possible to have the turbine reach a good operating speed quickly or at lower engine speeds without severely diminishing its utility at higher engine speeds.

Twin-scroll turbocharger

A twin-scroll turbocharger design uses two separate chambers to better harness energy from alternating exhaust gas pulses. The chambers' nozzles may also be of different sizes, to better balance low-rpm response and high-rpm output.

Sequential twin turbochargers

Sequential turbocharger systems use differently-sized turbochargers to decrease turbo lag without compromising ultimate boost output and engine power.

Nitrous oxide

Nitrous oxide (N2O) is mixed with incoming air, serving as an oxidizing agent to burn more fuel for supplemental power when a turbocharger is not spinning quickly. This also produces more exhaust gases so that the turbocharger reaches operating speed faster, providing more oxygen for combustion, and the N2O flow is reduced accordingly. The expense of both the system itself and the consumable N2O can be significant.

Water injection

For increased engine power, and to augment other benefits of forced induction, an aftermarket water injection system can be added to the induction system of both gasoline and diesel internal combustion engines.

References

External links
 http://www.greencarcongress.com/2005/08/inside_vws_new_.html

Superchargers
Turbochargers

de:Twincharger